When Tomorrow Comes is a 1939 American romantic drama directed by John M. Stahl and starring Irene Dunne and Charles Boyer. The screenplay concerns a waitress who falls in love with a man who later turns out to be a married concert pianist. Bernard B. Brown won the Academy Award for Best Sound.

A scene in the film where the two protagonists take refuge from a storm in a church was the subject of Cain v. Universal Pictures, a case in which the writer James M. Cain sued Universal Pictures, the scriptwriter and the director for copyright infringement.  Judge Leon Rene Yankwich ruled that there was no resemblance between the scenes in the book and the film other than incidental "scènes à faire", or natural similarities due to the situation, establishing an important legal precedent.

Plot
Philip Andre Chagal is a famous concert pianist who visits a restaurant struggling waitress Helen works at. Philip is immediately attracted to her and joins her at a union rally, and discovers Helen's left-wing political opinions when she suggests every union member goes on strike. After the meeting, Philip praises her speech and leadership skills, despite being anti-union himself, and they fall in love.

On a date in Long Island, the couple relax on Philip's boat when the weather turns violent. They disembark and take cover in Philip's summer home, but the storm becomes a hurricane. Helen and Philip kiss, and try to leave for the nearest town, eventually staying overnight in a church. Helen later discovers Philip is married and secretly leaves for the mainland. Philip tries to apologize and make Helen reconsider by introducing her to his wife Madeline. Helen hesitates, and Madeline pulls her aside, revealing she is heartbroken and guilty about a stillbirth she and Philip are still mourning five years later. Despite still being in love with the pianist, Helen ends the relationship.

Cast
 Irene Dunne as Helen Lawrence
 Charles Boyer as Philip Chagal
 Barbara O'Neil as Madeleine Chagal
 Onslow Stevens as Jim Holden
 Nydia Westman as Lulu
 Nella Walker as Betty Dumont
 Fritz Feld as Nicholas

Uncredited roles include Frances Robinson, Helen Lynd, Kitty McHugh, Florence Lake, Dorothy Granger, Mary Treen, Harry C. Bradley, Milton Parsons, Addison Richards, George Humbert, Milburn Stone, Frank Darien, Gaylord Pendleton, Mickey Kuhn, and Ed Peil.

Development 

Charles Boyer and Irene Dunne had previously starred together in Love Affair, Leo McCarey's romantic dramedy distributed by RKO Pictures. It was a surprise hit, despite its troubled production, and viewers enjoyed watching Dunne and Boyer's characters fall in love. Hollywood was excited about the newest popular team-up, but Boyer was just announced to star in All This, and Heaven Too and was supposedly prepping for Intermezzo. Dunne was waiting for Universal Pictures to find a new project for her because she "owed" them a movie, and might have been the cause of Boyer abandoning his new films just as Universal revealed they were developing a new film that might be a contender for everyone's new favorite couple. Dwight Taylor wrote an adaptation of A Modern Cinderella, an unpublished story James M. Cain had sold to Universal in November the year before, but had rewritten the story in a style that could fit the Dunne-Boyer mold. Boyer noticed his character shared allusions to Love Affairs Michel Marnet and only accepted the role if he would receive the same pay (estimated $100,000) for his appearance.

Filming took place in spring and was more relaxed than the Love Affair set, but Stahl was said to have lost  from the stress of retakes.

After the movie's release, Photoplay magazine's October issue featured two essays written by Boyer and Dunne about each other, in the style of a parlor game where a player who briefly left the room guesses the secret noun other contestants chose by asking questions like "If I were that person, what kind of car would I be?" The editor explained: "Surely, working together as they do and have done, and being analytical, intelligent people, each would give a clear-limned portrait of the other; unbiased, colorful, exciting." Boyer's essay, "Irene: As Seen By Charles Boyer", described Dunne in prose, while Dunne's essay, "Charles: As Seen By Irene Dunne", described Boyer under topical subtitles, but Wes D. Gehring pointed out both essays' frequent references to fine art, as well as Dunne personifying Boyer through French impressionism.

Controversy 
After the film's release, James M. Cain sued Universal Pictures, Taylor and Stahl for copyright infringement, arguing Taylor's deviation from A Modern Cinderella had sneaked in the church scene from his 1937 story Serenade, a story previously called "unfilmable". Taylor admitted he read Serenade during the time of its release but denied theft, whereas Stahl denied knowing of the story's existence. Cain lost the case in December 14, and Judge Leon Yankwich ruled there was no resemblance between neither the scenes or the movie and book. Cain v. Universal Pictures Co. is noted as the first case in American law to use the scènes à faire doctrine.

Reception 
The movie was Universal's most successful film of 1939. Audiences appreciated seeing another film with the Boyer and Dunne pairing so soon after the first, but critical reaction was mixed to negative, seemingly not blaming the actors for their disdain. Frank S. Nugent wrote, "Boyer, with the charm that has made him one of our few authentic Matinée idols, and Miss Dunne, always a pleasant and sincere performer, are unequal to the task of bringing life and conviction to James Cain's made-to-order script." Philip Hartung called the ending "silly", but praised Barbara O'Neill for "doing an excellent piece of acting as the deranged wife." Franz Hoellering wrote, "It is a confused Charles Boyer-Irene Dunne vehicle which makes one wish to see Boyer again in an important picture and Irene Dunne as the brilliant comedienne she is." Time magazine bluntly wrote: " will not find it notable for novelty."

Some critical reception showed optimism. "It carries a hefty appeal to women [but] also provides strong entertainment for general audiences," Variety wrote, "Miss Dunne and Boyer are ideally teamed to provide a sincere and understanding romance, despite the obstacles presented for a happy conclusion." Daily Variety wrote, "It is the kind of love story, deep and rich and passionate, which John M. Stahl does better than any other producer-director in the business." The Hollywood Reporter said, "It is a thoughtful, painstaking film in its execution and will undoubtedly make its appeal to feminine sentimentality. But the opposite sex, too, will react to the gentle tug of its poignancy." Digest attempted—"Give John Stahl a triangle to play with, give him Irene Dunne and Charles Boyer for the sympathetic points of that triangle, and the result should spell money"—but then added: "It's just too bad that the writer, or writers, couldn't make up their minds what story they were telling."

Expected comparisons to Love Affair also followed. The Kansas City Times wrote, "[When Tomorrow Comes] does not have as much comedy in it as when Miss Dunne and Mr. Boyer presented last season when they co-starred in Love Affair." "There is something missing in When Tomorrow Comes[;] There isn't the sparkling wit of Love Affair," said The Brooklyn Daily Eagle. "It is the usual Hollywood Cinderella touch. And Charles Boyer and Irene Dunne, the leads, don't seem to miss it at all. [I]ndeed, [Stahl] has woven together the elements for a romance that is as near to actuality and as far from affection as that of the Love Affair starring effort of Boyer and Miss Dunne."

Legacy 
Although not an official remake, 1957's Interlude, directed by Douglas Sirk, was also based on Cain's story. It starred June Allyson and Rossano Brazzi.

Notes

References

Bibliography

External links

1939 films
1939 romantic drama films
American romantic drama films
American black-and-white films
Films based on works by James M. Cain
Films directed by John M. Stahl
Films that won the Best Sound Mixing Academy Award
Films about pianos and pianists
Films involved in plagiarism controversies
Universal Pictures films
1930s English-language films
1930s American films